Ordynsky (masculine), Ordynskaya (feminine), or Ordynskoye (neuter) is the name of several inhabited localities in Russia.

Urban localities
Ordynskoye, a work settlement in Ordynsky District of Novosibirsk Oblast

Rural localities
Ordynsky, Irkutsk Oblast, a settlement in Ekhirit-Bulagatsky District of Ust-Orda Buryat Okrug in Irkutsk Oblast
Ordynsky, Krasnodar Krai, a settlement in Kurchansky Rural Okrug of Temryuksky District in Krasnodar Krai;